Saltmarshe is a hamlet in the East Riding of Yorkshire, England. It forms part of the civil parish of Laxton, and is situated on the north bank of the River Ouse, downstream from York, Selby and Goole.

Saltmarshe lies within the Parliamentary constituency of Haltemprice and Howden an area that mainly consists of middle class suburbs, towns and villages. The area is affluent, placed as the 10th most affluent in the country in a Barclays Private Clients survey, and has one of the highest proportions of owner-occupiers in the country.

Saltmarshe Hall is a Grade II* listed 19th-century country house on the western edge of the hamlet.

Saltmarshe railway station is on the Sheffield to Hull Line.

References

External links

Hamlets in the East Riding of Yorkshire